Papyrus 99 (Gregory-Aland), designated by 𝔓99, is an early papyrus manuscript with quotations from the Pauline epistles of the New Testament in Greek-Latin. Four leaves have survived.

Description 
This papyrus is part of the Chester Beatty collection. It is usually considered as a glossary with single words and phrases from: 
 Rom 1:1;
 2 Cor 1:3-6, 1:6-17, 1:20-24, 2:1-9, 2:9-5:13, 5:13-6:3, 6:3-8:13, 8:14-22, 9:2-11:8, 11:9-23, 11:26-13:11;
 Gal 1:4-11, 1:18-6:15, 1:14-2:4, 2:4-3:19, 3:19-4:9;
 Eph 1:4-2:21, 1:22(?), 3:8-6:24

The text is written in 1 column per page, 27-30 lines per page.

It also contains a Latin lexicon and Greek grammar.

Elliot calls this papyrus '... a haphazard collection of unconnected verses from the Pauline letters [that] could have been a school exercise ...'

The manuscript is housed at the Chester Beatty Library (P. Chester B. Ac. 1499, fol 11–14) in Dublin.

See also 
 List of New Testament papyri

References

Further reading 
 Wouters (1988), Alfons, The Chester Beatty Codex AC 1499, a Graeco-Latin lexicon on the Pauline Epistles, and a Greek grammar, Peeters, 
 Dickey (2019), Emily A Re-Examination of New Testament Papyrus P99 (Vetus Latina AN glo Paul), New Testament Studies. Cambridge University Press, 65(1), pp. 103–121. https://doi.org/10.1017/S0028688518000243.

External links

New Testament papyri
3rd-century biblical manuscripts
Early Greek manuscripts of the New Testament
Manuscripts in the Chester Beatty Library
Epistle to the Romans papyri
Second Epistle to the Corinthians papyri
Epistle to the Galatians papyri
Epistle to the Ephesians papyri